Pontotoc may refer to:

 Fulton, Kentucky, formerly known as Pontotoc
 Pontotoc, Mississippi
 Pontotoc, Texas
 Pontotoc County, Mississippi
 Pontotoc County, Oklahoma
 Pontotoc, Oklahoma, an unincorporated community in Johnston County